Tei is a neighborhood in Bucharest, Romania - Sector 2. The name comes from the name of a lake in this area: Lacul Tei (Linden Tree Lake). The name of the lake comes from the linden woods that existed around it in the past. 

At the beginning of the 19th century, the area belonged to the Ghica family, who built the Orthodox Teiul Doamnei Ghica Church (1833) and, in 1822 the Ghica Tei palace (Palatul Ghica). Around 1900, the area south of the "Calea Lacul Teiului" (today "Bulevardul Lacul Tei") had been sold to Bulgarian gardeners (called "sârbi"). After the First World War, on the grounds located north and southeast of the "Calea Lacul Teiului", houses were  built. During the Nicolae Ceauşescu era, many apartment buildings, as well as the Technical University of Civil Engineering of Bucharest and the State Circus were built.

To this day, there are still many linden trees in the neighbourhood, and when they are in bloom, they spread a strong scent across the streets. Tei has developed in the last few years from a middle-class neighbourhood into an upper-class one, with many mansions being built recently.

Images

Districts of Bucharest